Dresden is an unincorporated community in Cavalier County, North Dakota, United States.

Dresden is home to the Cavalier County Museum.

External links

Photos of historical displays in Dresden
 Seventy fifth anniversary, Dresden, Cavalier County, North Dakota, 1897-1972 from the Digital Horizons website

Unincorporated communities in Cavalier County, North Dakota
Unincorporated communities in North Dakota